Indy Racing 2000 is a racing game for the Nintendo 64 that was released in 2000. The game is based on the 1999 Indy Racing League and races a 20-car field. The game's modes of play include single race, Championship, Two player and Gold Cup. There are 9 tracks and 11 races. The Gold Cup mode lets the player race Midget cars, sprint cars, Formula cars, and Indy cars on fictional tracks (All but 1 are road courses).

Features
Car customization including transmission, tire pressure and gear ratio adjustment.
Day and night races.
Every official IRL venue.
Full Indy Racing League license.
20 drivers and their vehicles based on 1999 season.
Single Race, Practice, Competition and Championship modes.
Full stat tracking.
Automated pit stops in arcade mode vs. full control in simulation mode.
Two-player split screen races.
Sprint, midget and F2000 cars available within game.
Eight Oval courses.
Multiple camera angles during race and replays.
Animated pit crews.
Heads up display includes draft meter.

List of drivers and teams

Tracks
 Orlando
 Phoenix
 Charlotte
 Indianapolis
 Texas
 Pikes Peak
 Atlanta
 Dover
 Las Vegas

Reception

The game received "average" reviews according to the review aggregation website GameRankings.

References

External links
 

2000 video games
Nintendo 64 games
Nintendo 64-only games
North America-exclusive video games
IndyCar Series video games
Video games developed in the United States
Multiplayer and single-player video games
Paradigm Entertainment games
Infogrames games